Ajeenkya D Y Patil is an Indian educationist and economist. He is the son of D. Y. Patil. He is Chairman of the D Y Patil Group, Chancellor of Ajeenkya D Y Patil University and Pro-chancellor of the Dr. D. Y. Patil University.

Early life and education
Ajeenkya D Y Patil was born in Mumbai, the son of Pushpalata Patil and D. Y. Patil, a Padma Shri recipient, and founder of the D Y Patil Group. After his initial schooling and graduation, Patil did his MBA from Richmond College, UK and specialization in Marketing from the London School of Economics. He has been awarded an honorary doctorate by University of Central Lancashire, United Kingdom, for his achievements in the field of education.

Career
Ajeenkya Patil was appointed as Chairman of CII Western Region Sub Committee on Education in March 2016. He has also served as Chairman of the Central Board for Workers Education (CBWE) by Ministry of Labour, Government of India. Patil has been appointed as Honorary Consul of the Republic of Guyana by the Government of Guyana. He stood for the 2014 elections in the Karad south assembly constituency against the then Chief Minister of Maharashtra, Shri Prithviraj Chavan. Patil was honoured with the Budhbhushan Jeevan Gaurav Award. He has also been conferred as the “Times Men of the Year 2018”  He was given the Best Leader and Best Brand Award 2019, by India's 100 Greatest Brand & Leaders which is an IPR-based (Intellectual Property Rights) award.

Ajeenkya D Y Patil University, Pune has been established under Maharashtra Govt. Act of 2015 of Government of Maharashtra. The undergraduate and graduate programs under this university are automobile designing, digital modelling, engineering, management, media and communication, architecture, filmmaking and law. It is situated in D Y Patil Knowledge City, Pune.

Posts held

References

External links
D Y Patil Achiever's Awards
Artracadabra
Inauguration of the D Y Patil Knowledge City in Pune
Ajeenkya D Y Patil Filmfare Awards (Marathi)
Dr. Ajeenkya D. Y. Patil appointed Hon Consul of Guyana -The Day After 
Bihar governor’s son is Sena candidate
Dr Ajeenkya DY Patil Awarded Budhbhushan Jeevan Gaurav Award - Youth Incorporated 
Talk with Board students- ABP Majha
Digital Technology Senate 
Ecosystem enablement
Tech Senate
Pune Times Fashion Week 2019
Ajeenkya Dy Patil University Bets Big On Competency Based Transcript System 
Varun Gandhi with Ajeenkya D Y Patil -
ADYPU Announces B.Des in Fashion Design 
Plastic a global menace
'This Budget will provide the much needed stimulus to the Indian Economy'
The Changing Landscape of Education
Ajeenkya D Y Patil Filmfare Marathi Awards 2014
National Law Day Award 2015 in Mumbai
Dr. Ajeenkya DY Patil, Ajeenkya DY Patil University | Digital Technology Senate
Ajeenkya DY Patil University bets big on Competency Based Transcript System
Ajeenkya D Y Patil University awarded India's Most Admirable Brand
Plastic … A Global Menace
Centre of Excellence for Women Empowerment Inaugurated in Ajeenkya D Y Patil University
ADYPU bags World Education Awards
Forced Acceptance Of Online Education Would Augur Well For Online Delivery Of Educational Opportunities
Cognitive Abilities And Spirituality Are Most Important Skills For The Youth(
The Changing Landscape Of Education
Transformative power of technology in education sector
Industry collaboration and ecosystem enablement key for a seamless ‘new normal’
Education must focus on skill development - Dr Ajeenkya DY Patil for Businessworld
Ajeenkya DY Patil Group launches GoSchool

Living people
20th-century Indian educational theorists
Year of birth missing (living people)